Angola became independent of Portugal in 1975, but the U.S. did not recognize the Government of Angola declared by the MPLA. The U.S. recognized Angola after multiparty elections were held in 1992.

The United States established relations with Angola through the opening of a Liaison Office in Luanda on January 10, 1992, with Jeffrey Millington as Director. The United States recognized the government of Angola on May 19, 1993. The first ambassador was appointed on May 9, 1994.

Ambassadors

The US ambassador to Angola holds the title Ambassador Extraordinary and Plenipotentiary.

Notes

See also
Angola – United States relations
Foreign relations of Angola
Ambassadors from the United States

References
United States Department of State: Background notes on Angola

External links
 

Angola
Main
United States